Milus may refer to:

, Swiss watch manufacturer
Milus or Miles (bishop of Susa) (d. c. 340)
Milus or Melus of Bari (d. 1020)